Eduard Parts (1899 Vana-Kariste Parish (now Mulgi Parish), Kreis Pernau – ?) was an Estonian politician. He was a member of II Riigikogu. He was a member of the Riigikogu since 5 April 1924. He replaced Aleksander Erdman. On 17 May 1924, he was removed from his position and he was replaced by Johanna Andreesen.

References

1899 births
Year of death missing
People from Mulgi Parish
People from Kreis Pernau
Workers' United Front politicians
Members of the Riigikogu, 1923–1926